Pterostylis collina, commonly known as the shiny bull orchid, is a species of orchid endemic to New South Wales. It has a rosette of leaves and when flowering, a single reddish-brown, green and white flower with a curved top.

Description
Flowering plants have a rosette at the base of a flowering stem with a single reddish-brown, green and white flower. The dorsal sepal and petals are joined and curve forward in a semi-circle forming a hood called the "galea" over the column with the dorsal sepal longer than the petals. The lateral sepals are pressed against the galea and there is a broad, flat sinus between their bases. Flowering occurs between April and August.

Taxonomy and naming
The shiny bull orchid was first formally described in 1929 by Herman Rupp who gave it the name Pterostylis ophioglossa var. collina. The description was published in Proceedings of the Royal Society of New South Wales from a specimen collected in the Paterson Valley north of Newcastle. In 1989 David Jones and Mark Clements raised the variety to species status with the name Pterostylis collina. The specific epithet (collina) is a Latin word meaning "of a hill" or "hilly".

Distribution and habitat
Pterostylis collina grows in wet forest and on the edges of rainforest on the north coast north of Newcastle.

References

collina
Endemic orchids of Australia
Orchids of New South Wales
Plants described in 1929
Taxa named by Herman Rupp